Horkelia wilderae is a rare species of flowering plant in the rose family known by the common name Barton Flats horkelia. It is endemic to San Bernardino County, California, where it is known from only about ten occurrences in the vicinity of Barton Flats. It grows in the montane chaparral and woodlands habitat where chaparral meets pine forest, and it is threatened by logging.

Description 
Horkelia wilderae is a perennial herb producing an inconspicuous rosette of prostrate leaves around a small caudex. Each leaf is up to 10 centimeters long and is made up of several pairs of wedge-shaped leaflets divided at the tips into several lobes. The inflorescence is an open array of up to 15 flowers atop an erect stalk, each flower made up of five pointed, green, often recurved sepals and five wedge-shaped to oblong white petals.

References

External links
Jepson Manual Treatment — Horkelia wilderae
Horkelia wilderae — U.C. Photo gallery

wilderae
Endemic flora of California
Natural history of the California chaparral and woodlands
Natural history of San Bernardino County, California
Natural history of the Transverse Ranges
~
Critically endangered flora of California